This is a list of the municipalities in the state of Piauí (PI), located in the Northeast Region of Brazil. Piauí is divided into 224 municipalities, which are grouped into 15 microregions, which are grouped into 4 mesoregions.

See also
Geography of Brazil

Piaui